Finny may refer to:

 Steven Finn (cricketer)
 a nickname of Phineas Finn, protagonist of Anthony Trollope's novels Phineas Finn and Phineas Redux
 Finny, a character in the novel A Separate Peace by John Knowles
 Finny, County Mayo, a small village and townland in Ireland
 Finny snake eel

See also
 Feeney, a surname
 Finney, a surname
 Finnie, a surname
 Phinney, a surname